General elections were held in Romania on 28 November 2004, with a second round of the presidential elections on 12 December between Prime Minister Adrian Năstase of the ruling Social Democratic Party of Romania (PSD) and Bucharest Mayor Traian Băsescu of the opposition Justice and Truth Alliance (DA). Băsescu was elected President by a narrow majority of just 51.2%.

Following 2003 amendments to the constitution which lengthened the presidential term to five years, these were the last joint elections to the presidency and Parliament in Romania's political history thus far.

Campaign

Parliamentary elections
The main contenders were the left-wing alliance made up of the then incumbent Social Democratic Party of Romania (PSD) and the Romanian Humanist Party (PUR), and, on the other hand, the center-right Justice and Truth Alliance (DA) comprising the conservative-liberal National Liberal Party (PNL) and the initially social-democratic Democratic Party (PD) which later adopted a center-right Christian democratic ideology.

Other significant contenders were the Greater Romania Party (PRM) (right-wing nationalists), the ethnic Hungarian party Democratic Alliance of Hungarians in Romania (UDMR), and the Union for Romanian Reconstruction (UPRR), a group of right-wing technocrats.

Conduct
The opposition alleged fraudulent use by the PSD of "supplementary lists", designed to help Romanians in transit to vote.  Traditionally, Romanians voted with a cardboard identity card, which was stamped when they voted. Most Romanians now have laminated plastic IDs, to which a printed stamp is affixed when a person votes. However, the stamps can be easily removed. In spite of this, electoral fraud is nearly impossible to commit, as every citizen is assigned to one local voting station, the only location he/she can vote at.

The opposition claimed that there were organized "electoral excursions" of PSD supporters who were bussed to various towns to vote several times. This was corroborated by several teams of journalists, who followed the buses.

The government attacked the opposition by arguing that 'rumours of fraud' affect Romania's economy and its external credibility.

In January 2005, the IMAS institute of statistics released an analysis of the voting results in the 16,824 precincts. In the top 1,000 precincts with the most votes on the supplementary lists, the PSD had 43% to the DA's 23%, while in the precincts with fewest votes on supplementary lists, the PSD had 30% to the DA's 34%. The same trend was true in the precincts with most void votes. Wayback Machine

Presidential candidates

Results

President

Corneliu Vadim Tudor positioned himself against Băsescu, without openly endorsing Năstase. Marko Bela openly endorsed Adrian Năstase. Gheorghe Ciuhandu openly endorsed Băsescu.

Parliament

Senate

Chamber of Deputies

Aftermath
On 13 December, the PUR president Dan Voiculescu hinted that they have more in common with the DA (both have a center-right orientation) and that they might break from the PSD, but one day later said that he would remain with PSD. It has been suggested by the press that this could be result of a blackmail about his communist past. By 25 December both UDMR and PUR signed a protocol of alliance with DA (Justice and Truth), with the designated prime minister being Călin Popescu-Tăriceanu. Thus, the PSD was left in opposition while Justice and Truth Alliance (DA), the Democratic Alliance of Hungarians in Romania (UDMR), and the Humanist Party (PUR, renamed Conservative Party in 2005) formed the government.

Notes

References

External links
Central Electoral Bureau 
Fraud worries in Romanian poll BBC News

Parliamentary elections in Romania
Presidential elections in Romania
Romania
General
Presidential election
Romania
Romania